Sherlock Township is a township in Finney County, in the U.S. state of Kansas.  As of the 2000 census, its population was 2,758.

Geography
According to the USGS, it contains one cemetery, Toper.

Transportation
Sherlock Township contains one airport or landing strip, L C Land Incorporated Airport.

References
 USGS Geographic Names Information System (GNIS)

External links
 US-Counties.com
 City-Data.com

Townships in Finney County, Kansas
Townships in Kansas